Melgund may refer to:

Melgund Castle, in Angus, Scotland
Melgund, Kenora District, Ontario, a local service board and geographic township in Kenora District, Ontario, Canada
Melgund, Thunder Bay District, Ontario, an unincorporated place and railway point in Thunder Bay District, Ontario, Canada